Victor Julien-Laferrière (born 1990 in Paris) is a French cellist who won the first prize of the Queen Elisabeth Competition in 2017.

References

External links 
 https://www.victorjulienlaferriere.com/
 https://www.musicaglotz.com/musiciens/julien-laferriere-victor-2/?lang=en

French classical cellists
1990 births
Musicians from Paris
Living people
Prize-winners of the Queen Elisabeth Competition